Lokmanya Tilak Terminus - Bidar Express is an express train of the Indian Railways connecting Lokmanya Tilak Terminus in Maharashtra and Bidar of Karnataka. It is currently being operated with 11075/11076 train numbers on a weekly basis.

Service

The 11075/Mumbai LTT - Bidar Express has an average speed of 49 km/hr and covers 655 km in 13 hrs 25 mins. 11076/Bidar - Mumbai LTT Express has an average speed of 42 km/hr and 655 km in 15 hrs 35 mins.

Route and halts 

The important halts of the train are:

Coach composite

The train consists of 18 coaches :

 1 AC II Tier
 2 AC III Tier
 7 Sleeper Coaches
 6 General
 2 Second-class Luggage/parcel van

Traction

Both trains are hauled by a Kalyan Loco Shed based WDM-3D diesel locomotive from Kurla to Bidar.

Notes

External links 

 11075/Mumbai LTT - Bidar Express
 11076/Bidar - Mumbai LTT Express

References 

Express trains in India
Rail transport in Maharashtra
Rail transport in Karnataka
Transport in Mumbai
Railway services introduced in 2015
Transport in Bidar